The Kensington Automobile Company was an veteran era automobile company from 1899 to 1904 in Buffalo, New York.

History 
In August of 1899 the Kensington Bicycle Company ceased bicycle production to begin automobile construction. In 1900, a small electric car was marketed that was joined by a steam runabout in 1901. In 1902 a two-cylinder gasoline automobile was introduced and produced into 1904. The company failed in 1904.

References

Veteran vehicles
Defunct motor vehicle manufacturers of the United States
Steam cars
Electric cars
1900s cars
1890s cars
Motor vehicle manufacturers based in New York (state)
Vehicle manufacturing companies established in 1899
Vehicle manufacturing companies disestablished in 1904
Cars introduced in 1900